Jim Hoffstetter (27 October 1937 – 10 March 2006) was a Luxembourgian footballer. He played in 39 matches for the Luxembourg national football team from 1960 to 1967.

References

1937 births
2006 deaths
Luxembourgian footballers
Luxembourg international footballers
Place of birth missing
Association footballers not categorized by position